The 1976 Stanford Cardinals football team represented Stanford University in the Pacific-8 Conference during the 1976 NCAA Division I football season. Led by fifth-year head coach Jack Christiansen, the Cardinals were 6–5 overall (5–2 in Pac-8, third) and played home games on campus at Stanford Stadium in Stanford, California

After a disappointing season that started at 1–4, Christiansen was fired the day before the last game of the season, the Big Game at Cal; he coached that final game, which Stanford rallied to win in the final two minutes.

The Cardinals had five Pac-8 wins in each of his last four seasons, finishing no lower than third.
 
Bill Walsh, the offensive coordinator of the NFL's San Diego Chargers, was hired as head coach in December, and led Stanford for the next two seasons, both ending with bowl wins.

Schedule

Roster
OT Gary Anderson
QB Guy Benjamin
LB Gordy Ceresino
QB Mike Cordova
QB Steve Dils
WR James Lofton
WR Tony Hill
DE Duncan McColl
PK Mike Michel 
QB Turk Schonert

NFL Draft
Five Cardinals were selected in the 1977 NFL Draft.

List of Stanford Cardinal in the NFL Draft

References

External links
 Game program: Stanford at Washington State – October 23, 1976

Stanford
Stanford Cardinal football seasons
Stanford Cardinals football